The Clearstream affair was a political scandal in France in the run-up to the 2007 presidential election.

The name refers to the Luxembourg bank Clearstream Banking S.A, now wholly owned by Deutsche Börse, which was alleged to have aided many prominent French politicians and companies in evading taxes. It was also suggested that Clearstream might have helped French individuals and companies to launder money arising from bribes surrounding the 1991 sale of six s to Taiwan (see Taiwan frigate scandal). Clearstream denied the allegations.

Beginning of the affair
A list of accounts supposedly held by French individuals at Clearstream was sent anonymously to investigating magistrate Renaud van Ruymbeke on four occasions between May and October 2004. At that time, van Ruymbeke was investigating possible bribes in the 1991 frigate sale. The lists quickly proved to be false, and several of the people named on them pressed charges for "false denunciation".

Political impact
Among those pressing charges was prominent French politician Nicolas Sarkozy, who was preparing his (ultimately successful) campaign for the presidency.

Sarkozy's main political rival on the right-wing of French politics at the time was Interior Minister Dominique de Villepin, who became Prime Minister of France in 2005. It later transpired that De Villepin had known about the existence of the lists since at least January 2004. As Interior Minister, he would also have known that French secret services considered the lists to be forgeries. He did not, however, pass this information on to Judge Van Ruymbeke. De Villepin was indicted on charges of complicity to false denunciation on 18 November 2008, and tried at the Paris Correctional Court in September and October 2009. He was acquitted of the charges on 28 January 2010. Three co-defendants were convicted for their roles in the affair, while a fifth person was acquitted.

In popular culture
In 2014 Vincent Garenq directed a film about the event, The Clearstream Affair (French title: L'Enquête).

References

Contemporary French history
Politics of France
Political scandals in France
2007 in France